Léon Honoré Ponscarme Jr. (21 January 1879 – 24 November 1916) was a French cyclist. He competed in the men's sprint event at the 1900 Summer Olympics. He was killed in action during World War I.

See also
 List of Olympians killed in World War I

References

External links
 

1879 births
1916 deaths
French male cyclists
Olympic cyclists of France
Cyclists at the 1900 Summer Olympics
Cyclists from Paris
French military personnel killed in World War I